Chungli Ao is the prestige dialect of Ao and it is a Sino-Tibetan language of northeast India. It is the most widely spoken of the Ao languages which also comprise Mongsen Ao and Changki. It is taught up to the tenth grade in schools of the Mokokchung district.  It is also spoken by the Ao Nagas of Nagaland, a hill state in northeast India.  Being the official language of religion, the dialect has a Bible translation and is used in church services as well as to make public announcements. A local Chungli newspaper is also published online. The number of speakers who reported Chungli Ao as their mother tongue are approximately 130,000 according to the 2011 census report of India. A phonological reconstruction of Proto-Central-Naga has been compiled by Daniel Bruhn

History
During the American Baptist Mission to Naga Hills, Dr E.W. Clark first came in contact with the Molungkimong village that paved the way for a common Ao language. Chungli Ao is spoken in Molungkimong and Molungyimsen and other villages throughout Ao territory by roughly 50% of the Ao-speaking population. The speech of Molungkimong is the prestige dialect due to Baptist missionaries' influence. Most Ao can speak Chungli even if they are from Mongsen-speaking regions. Chungli is taught in schools. Various trans-Dikhu neighbouring dialects of Chungli Ao are spoken east of the Dikhu River in Yacham, Tengsa, and Longla. These are poorly documented; Yacham and Tengsa may be separate languages (van Driem 2001).

Numbers

Phonology
Chungli Ao is a tonal language. There are three distinct tonal levels: low, mid and high. There is evidence to prove that low and mid as well as low and high are contrastive. Chungli also has two contour tones, which are high-low and low-mid, though they are quite rare.

Vowels

Consonants

Morphology
1) Chungli ao is an agglutinative language where the verbs lack person and number marking. For example:

PREFIX    – STEM     -LEXICAL SUFFIX     – DERIV. SUFFIX       – INFLEC. SUFFIX
 me- NEG             -maʔ ‘completely’   -tsɨʔ BEN             -tsɨ IRR
 te- PROH            -et ‘persistently’  -tep RECIP            -əɹ PRES 
                      etc.                etc.                  etc. 

This applies for both finite and non-finite forms of the verb.

2) The following table shows the case marking present in Chungli Ao.

References

Ao languages
Languages of Nagaland